Three ships of the Royal Navy have borne the name HMS Advantage:

  was an 18-gun ship built in 1590 and burnt in 1613.
  was a 26-gun ship captured from the Dutch in 1652 and sold in 1655.
  was a rescue tug of the Favourite class commissioned in 1943 under Lend-Lease and returned to the United States Navy in 1946.

See also

References
 

Royal Navy ship names